Varada Sethu (Born: Varada Sethumadhavan, 1992) is an Indian-born British actress, best known for playing DS Mishal Ali in the BBC apocalyptic TV Series Hard Sun. She has also featured in Now You See Me 2 as the assistant to Michael Caine’s character.

Early life
Varada Sethu and her twin sister, Abhaya, were born in Kerala, India, and are of Malayalam descent. Sethu's parents were both doctors. Having moved to the North East of England at a young age, she grew up in Benton, Tyne and Wear,  near Newcastle upon Tyne. Sethu attended Dame Allan’s Schools and was a member of the National Youth Theatre. During her final year of sixth form, Sethu won the 2010 Miss Newcastle competition. She went on to study Veterinary medicine at University of Bristol, later switching to Physiology. Sethu has been performing both Bharatanatyam and Mohiniyattam from a young age. Sethu continued her acting education at the Identity School of Acting in London.

Career
In 2010, Sethu made her debut appearance on screen in the short film Impressions as Samena. In 2011,, Sethu landed the role of Kiran in the feature film Sket, then as Meghana Scariah in English: An Autumn in London in 2012. In 2015 she made an appearance in the 2000 TV series Doctors as PC Kylie Green. 

Her career continued in 2016 appearing as Peaseblossom in a 2016  TV movie version of  A Midsummer Night's Dream. Also in 2016, Sethu acted alongside Michael Caine and Daniel Radcliffe in Now You See Me 2 and as an Indian nurse in New Blood. 

In 2017, Sethu starred as Aisha in 2 episodes of Doctor Foster. Sethu also starred as DS Mishal Ali for 6 episodes in the British crime drama series Hard Sun in 2018.

In 2018, she starred as DS Mishal Ali in the BBC apocalyptic TV Series Hard Sun. 

In 2019, Sethu performed as a series regular in season seven of Strike Back: Revolution as Lance Corporal Manisha Chetri of the British Army. 

In 2022, Sethu plays rebel Cinta Kaz in the 2022 series Andor.

Filmography

Film

Television

References

External links
2016 Portfolio - Varada Sethu

Vimeo showreel 2015
Vimeo spotlight 2018

Living people
1992 births
21st-century English actresses
Actresses from Newcastle upon Tyne
Alumni of the Identity School of Acting
British actresses of Indian descent
English film actresses
English television actresses
Indian emigrants to England
People educated at Dame Allan's School